Christine Gaskell (born 1957) is a female British former swimmer.

Swimming career
Gaskell represented England and won a gold medal in the 100 breaststroke event, at the 1974 British Commonwealth Games in Christchurch, New Zealand. She also participated in the 200 metres breaststroke and medley relay.

She swam for the Rochdale Swimming Club and first gained international selection in 1972.

References

1957 births
Living people
British female swimmers
Swimmers at the 1974 British Commonwealth Games
Commonwealth Games medallists in swimming
Commonwealth Games gold medallists for England
20th-century British women
Medallists at the 1974 British Commonwealth Games